Park Mi-seon (born 13 September 1964) is a South Korean sprinter. She competed in the women's 4 × 100 metres relay at the 1988 Summer Olympics.

References

External links
 

1964 births
Living people
Athletes (track and field) at the 1988 Summer Olympics
South Korean female sprinters
Olympic athletes of South Korea
Place of birth missing (living people)
Asian Games medalists in athletics (track and field)
Athletes (track and field) at the 1982 Asian Games
Athletes (track and field) at the 1986 Asian Games
Asian Games bronze medalists for South Korea
Medalists at the 1982 Asian Games
Medalists at the 1986 Asian Games
Olympic female sprinters